Michael Stephen Hellawell (born 30 June 1938) is a former professional footballer who made 322 appearances in the Football League and played twice for England.

Life and career

Hellawell was born in Keighley, West Riding of Yorkshire. He and his brother John, who also played football professionally, attended St Bede's Grammar School in Bradford. Hellawell signed for Queens Park Rangers in August 1955 from Salts, a small non-League club from Saltaire, and made his debut in the home match against Exeter City on 25 February 1956. He was selected to play for the Third Division South representative team against the Northern Section in April 1957. He played 45 games in the Football League for Rangers before being transferred to Birmingham City in 1957.

While with Birmingham he played in the 1961 Inter-Cities Fairs Cup Final, won the League Cup in 1963, and won his two full caps for England, against France and Northern Ireland in 1962. After eight years at Birmingham he went on to play league football for Sunderland, Huddersfield Town and Peterborough United and non-league football for Bromsgrove Rovers.

Hellawell also showed promise as a cricket all-rounder for Warwickshire, for whom he played one first-class match.

Honours
Birmingham City
 Football League Cup: 1962–63
 Inter-Cities Fairs Cup runner-up: 1960–61

References

1938 births
Living people
Cricketers from Keighley
English footballers
England international footballers
Association football wingers
Queens Park Rangers F.C. players
Birmingham City F.C. players
Sunderland A.F.C. players
Huddersfield Town A.F.C. players
Peterborough United F.C. players
Bromsgrove Rovers F.C. players
English Football League players
English cricketers
Warwickshire cricketers
People educated at St. Bede's Grammar School